Golce may refer to the following places:
Golce, Silesian Voivodeship (south Poland)
Golce, Subcarpathian Voivodeship (south-east Poland)
Golce, West Pomeranian Voivodeship (north-west Poland)